Cum ex apostolatus officio is the name of a papal bull issued by Pope Paul IV in 1559; it states that only Catholics can be elected Popes, to the exclusion of non-Catholics, including former Catholics who have become public and manifest heretics.

References

External links

 Cum ex apostolatus officio (English and Latin text)

1559 works
16th-century papal bulls
Documents of Pope Paul IV
1559 in Christianity